Teldenia nigrinotata is a moth in the family Drepanidae. It was described by Warren in 1896. It is found on Fergusson Island and in New Guinea and possibly Australia.

References

Moths described in 1896
Drepaninae